Dolgiye Borody ( or Long Beards) also known as other names "Valdai" and "Uzhin" is a residence of the President of the Russian Federation and is located in the Novgorod Oblast, 20 kilometers from the city of Valdai, near the village of Dolgiye Borody.

History
The official name of the residence is the "Uzhin Holiday House", named after the lake, on its bank there is a special facility. The neighboring village of Long Beards (population in 2000 - 17 people), by the beginning of the XXI century merged with the village of Roshchino. In 1992, the pioneer camp "Kosmos" and the boarding house "Lazurny bank" that were next to the presidential residence were demolished. By 2000, the territory of the residence occupied 930 hectares.

The construction of the Object 201 (as the official documents called the residence) was started in 1934 for Stalin, who was briefly here only once, in 1939 - but the deafness of this place, hidden in the spruce forests, which was connected with the "mainland" by the only road, confused "The leader of the peoples". In 1940, on the shores of Lake Uzhin, the construction of three buildings was completed: the "Dacha No. 1" and "Dacha No. 2" connected to a single complex, the building for the protection of "Dacha No. 3" is closer to the village of Dolgi Brodi. Architecturally the dachas repeat the Stalin's dacha in Volyn. In August 1948 Andrei Zhdanov died on vacation in the sanatorium of the Central Committee of the CPSU on the territory of the current residence. Here, the wedding of Zhdanov's son Yuri and Stalin's daughter Svetlana Alliluyeva took place. The residence was used as a resting place for Nikita Khrushchev, Nikolai Ryzhkov and other Soviet officials. In the 1980s the residence was expanded and a new complex was built. The first Russian president, Boris Yeltsin also used to rest and fish here. Since 2000 Vladimir Putin has come to the residence.

Now the former sanatorium of the Central Committee of the CPSU is called the Federal State Budgetary Institution of the Administration of Affairs of the President of the Russian Federation "The Holiday House Valdai", designed for 320 seats. In 2007-2010," Dachas No. 1-3 "were reconstructed with the preservation of the historical The Congress Center is built on the territory of the complex. In the main building of the holiday house there is an assembly hall - a cinema, where the events of the Valdai Club were first held (the Valdai International Discussion Club).

References

Houses completed in the 20th century
Buildings and structures in Novgorod Oblast
Official residences in Russia
Official residences in the Soviet Union